2001: Do Hazaar Ek is a Bollywood Mystery film directed by Raj N. Sippy. It was released in 1998 and stars Dimple Kapadia, Jackie Shroff, Rajat Bedi and Tabu.

Plot

Following the brutal slaying of a call-girl named Julie in Mumbai, two police inspectors, namely Anil Kumar Sharma and Rajat Bedi are assigned to investigate and bring the culprit(s) to book. Anil and Rajat note that the killer leaves "2001" marked on the body of the victim. Anil learns that the man staying in Julie's room is a prominent Member of State Parliament, Ramaswamy, and would like to list him as a suspect. Julie's death is followed by more killings in the same style, and killed ones are Advocates Sarkari and Kajal, and a man named Krishna Rao. Then Ramaswamy himself is attacked, but survives and is hospitalized. When he regains consciousness for a brief period of time, he points an accusing finger at Rajat and then relapses. Not wanting to take any chance, Police Commissioner Malik places Rajat under house arrest. Then Anil comes across some evidence that links the killing to none other than Malik himself, while Rajat starts suspecting Anil and gathers evidence against Anil.

Cast
Jackie Shroff as Inspector Anil Sharma, Roshni's husband.
Dimple Kapadia as Roshni, Anil's wife.
Rajat Bedi as Inspector Rajat Bedi
Tabu as Billu
Gulshan Grover as Krishna Rao
Suresh Oberoi as Mr. Amirchand
Sadashiv Amrapurkar as Minister Ramaswamy
Mohan Joshi as Police Commissioner Malik
Sharat Saxena as Advocate P.K. Sarkari
Deven Verma as Billu's maternal uncle.
Navneet Nishan as Advocate Kajal
Upasana Singh as Julie
Mukesh Khanna as Dr. Vishal Sharma, Anil’s father. (special appearance)
Kishore Bhanushali as Havaldar
Anil Nagrath
Master Suraj
Baby Sharmika as Neelam

Soundtrack

Reception
Komal Nahta of Film Information was critical of the film, saying it "does not have the chill and thrill of a suspense drama".

References

External links
 
 Planet Bollywood Review

1998 films
1990s Hindi-language films
Films scored by Anand Raj Anand
Indian thriller films
Films directed by Raj N. Sippy
1998 thriller films